Beryozovskaya GRES is a coal-fired power plant near the town of Sharypovo in Krasnoyarsk Krai, Russia. The power plant is owned by Unipro.

General information 
The Beryozovskaya power plant provides extra electricity for the Russian power grid during winter, when electrical demand peaks. In other seasons the average load of the power plant is below half its capacity as the Central Siberian region uses several more efficient hydro power plants.

The lignite used by the power plant belongs to Kansk-Achinsk basin with total reserves 600 bn tonne, one third of it is available for surface mining. The plant uses coal from a field with proved reserves of 3.7 bn tonne, which is 14 km away. The transportation of this fuel from the pit to power plant uses a transporter line, which is capable of transferring up to 40 mn tonne of coal annually.

Production has grown in last years and there are plans to develop the station by adding new generators. The power plant also performs centralized heat supply. For self-cooling purposes it uses reservoir, which holds back the river Beresh (Chulym basin), instead of applying cooling towers.

History 

According to original Soviet project the final installed capacity of the power plant should be 6,400 GW with eight 800 MW generators. The construction of Beryozovskaya GRES began in 1970, its first two generators were commissioned in 1990. Mounting of the chimney was completed in 1985, its height is 370 m. 

In 2012 Enka began construction of the third generator unit at the Berezovskaya power plant. The structural design of this project is comparable to the first two generators at the Berezovskaya power plant, but features an upgrade to increase efficiency and reduce nitrogen oxide emissions.

Present activities 
Installed capacity of the power plant was planned 1,600 MW. However, shortly after start of operation, the capacity of existing power units was reduced from targeted 1,600 MW to approx. 1,400 MW. It occurred due to the intensive slagging of boiler heating surfaces during the operation using the high-ash coal of the Berezovskoye deposit at maximum capacity parameters. In 2009, E.ON Russia JSC launched a project aimed to increase the capacity of the plant up to the targeted 1,600 MW. It became possible due to the use of up-to-date energy technologies. The project to increase installed capacity of power unit No. 2 was completed in the end of 2010. The similar project at power unit No. 1 was completed in 2011.
As of 2010 year, the power plant is undergoing modernization program, which must improve efficiency and output of existing generators. According to plans of OGK-4, capacity of station will raise to 1,600 MW in 2011. Also construction of third unit with 800 MW continues and should be accomplished in 2016. Company develops network of pipelines in the region for centralized heat supply to localities around. The new power unit#3 was put into operation in 2015. Now the total capacity of the plant is 2400 MW.

See also

 List of power stations in Russia

References

External links 
 

Coal-fired power stations in Russia
Power stations built in the Soviet Union
Chimneys in Russia